Hemidactylus ituriensis (common name Ituri leaf-toed gecko) is a species of gecko. As currently known, it is endemic to northeastern Democratic Republic of Congo, although its true range probably extends eastwards to Uganda and Kenya. It belongs to the "Hemidactylus fasciatus species group".

It is locally common in tropical moist forest at elevations above .

References

Hemidactylus
Geckos of Africa
Reptiles of the Democratic Republic of the Congo
Endemic fauna of the Democratic Republic of the Congo
Reptiles described in 1919
Taxa named by Karl Patterson Schmidt